The 2010 Jupiter impact event was a bolide impact event on Jupiter by an object estimated to be about  in diameter.  The impactor may have been an asteroid, comet, centaur, extinct comet, or temporary satellite  capture.

Observation

The impact happened 3 June 2010, and was recorded and first reported by amateur astronomer Anthony Wesley from Australia. The event was confirmed by Christopher Go at the Philippines, who recorded the event and released a video. Wesley is the same person who had been first to report the 2009 Jupiter impact event.

The observed flash lasted about two seconds. It was located in the South Equatorial Belt, about fifty degrees from the central meridian. Jupiter probably gets hit by several objects of this size each year.

On 20 August 2010 UT, yet another flash event was detected on Jupiter. As of 23 August two other observers had recorded the same event.

See also
Impact events on Jupiter
List of Jupiter events

References

External links

Jupiter Impact Event, 2010
Jupiter impact events
Articles containing video clips